Hadow is a Scottish surname.  A number of notable people have this name:

Lieutenant-Colonel Arthur Lovell Hadow (1877–1968) who was commanding the Royal Newfoundland Regiment on the day of its destruction on the first day of the Battle of the Somme
Colonel Arthur De Salis Hadow (1858–1915) was commander of the 10th battalion of the Yorkshire Regiment and was killed in the Battle of Loos.
Charles Scott Hadow (1801–1849) co-owner of Willis, Hadow and Co, wine merchants of Scot's Yard, Bush lane, London and trader in India.
Douglas Robert Hadow (1846–1865) who died during the descent after the first ascent of the Matterhorn
Edward Ash Hadow, (1831–1866) chemist who conducted pioneering research on cyanide.
 Major-General Frederick Edward Hadow (1836–1915) served during the Indian Mutiny, in the Madras Artillery, later became a Justice of the Peace in Hereford.
Professor George Hadow (1712–1780) professor of Hebrew and oriental languages at St Mary's College, University of St Andrews from 1748 to 1780
Canon Gerald Edgcumbe Hadow OBE (1911–1978) Missionary to Tanzania.
Gilbert Bethune Hadow (1832–1876) Surgeon in the 1st Battalion 5th Foot (Northumberland Fusiliers)
Sir Gordon Hadow (1908–1993) masterminded the transition of Gold Coast to independence from Great Britain.
Grace Eleanor Hadow (1875–1940) author, principal of St Anne's College, Oxford University and former vice-chairman of the Women's Institute
Principal James Hadow (1667–1747) Principal of St Mary's College, University of St Andrews from  1707 till 1747
Reverend James Hadow (1757–1847) Vicar of St Margaret's Church, Streatley, Bedfordshire for fifty nine years.
Sir (Reginald) Michael Hadow former British Ambassador to Israel and Argentina.
Patrick Douglas Hadow (1812–1876) former Chairman of P&O Shipping Company.
Patrick Francis Hadow (1855–1946) Wimbledon champion and big game hunter.
Commander Philip Henry Hadow, RN (1903–1942) Commander of HMS Ivanhoe which was mined and damaged in the North Sea.
Sir Robert Henry Hadow(1895–1963), diplomat and appeaser.
Walter Hadow (1849-1898) English cricketer, HM Commissioner for Prisons for Scotland.
Sir William Henry Hadow (1859–1937) educational reformer, musicologist and vice-chancellor of Sheffield University.

References